The Great North is an American animated sitcom created by Wendy Molyneux, Lizzie Molyneux, and Minty Lewis that premiered on Fox on January 3, 2021. The Molyneux sisters and Lewis serve as executive producers along with Loren Bouchard. The series features the voices of Nick Offerman, Jenny Slate, Will Forte, Dulcé Sloan, Paul Rust, and Aparna Nancherla.

In June 2020, the series was renewed for a second season ahead of its premiere. In May 2021, the series was renewed for a third season after airing its first season finale. The second season premiered on September 26, 2021. The third season premiered on September 25, 2022. In August 2022, Fox renewed the series for a fourth season.

Premise
Beef Tobin is a single father living in the fictional town of Lone Moose, Alaska with his four children Wolf, Ham, Judy, and Moon. Beef's life is centered on raising his children and keeping the family together. He is sometimes overbearing and smothering, but his deep love for his family is a central theme in each episode in the series.

Voice cast

Main
 Nick Offerman as Beef Tobin, the main protagonist who is a fisherman and divorced father of four. Beef is still coming to terms with being abandoned by his ex-wife Kathleen. He spent years pretending that she died tragically, despite all of the Tobin children knowing the truth. He is a supportive father who encourages his children to love and respect others, although he sometimes struggles with the many changes happening in their lives and worries that they will grow apart.
 Jenny Slate as Judy Tobin, an artistically-inclined sixteen-year-old and Beef's only daughter. Judy loves her family, sharing a deep bond with her "Alaskan twin" brother Ham (they are not actual twins, but were born 9 months apart). She dreams of exploring the world beyond their small, remote hometown.
 Will Forte as Wolf Tobin, Beef's oldest son and Honeybee's husband. A sensitive and optimistic young man, Wolf longs to make his father proud, although his eagerness often puts him beyond his depth.
 Dulcé Sloan as Honeybee Shaw, Wolf's African-American wife. Confident and adventurous, she moved from her hometown of Fresno after falling in love with Wolf, and is now adapting to life in a small Alaskan fishing town.
 Paul Rust as Ham Piercebrosnan Tobin, Beef's middle son. Ham is openly gay, which his family embraces. He shares a deep bond with his "Alaskan twin" sister Judy, and they often collaborate on creative endeavors. He enjoys baking, and secretly becomes the town's "cake lady" after the previous one was arrested. He is the lead singer of Lone Moose's First Punk Band.
 Aparna Nancherla as Moon Tobin, Beef's youngest son, who shares Beef's stoic demeanor and passion for outdoorsmanship. Despite being only 10 years old, Moon is unafraid of the intimidating Alaskan wildlife, and is often seen building traps for various animals (from ruffed grouse to Bigfoot) or exploring the wilderness around the family home. Moon wears a bear-like onesie almost all the time, even to school.

Recurring

 Tim Bagley as Principal Gibbons, the principal of Lone Moose School.
 Sarah Baker as Police Chief Edna, the chief of police in Lone Moose, who also owns the town boatyard and a sticker store. Baker also voiced Mary, the owner of a dance studio in Death Cliff in the episode "Dances with Wolfs Adventure", and is credited as the voice of "Wine Woman" in "Tusk in the Wind Adventure".
 Andy Daly as Cheesecake, a hard-partying friend of Wolf's who lives in a trailer behind a bar. Daly also voices Pete, the cashier at the Val-U-Buy, plus other characters.
 Gabe Delahaye as Old Jody Jr., a sketchy, raspy-voiced resident of Lone Moose who claims to be able to get anything for anyone.
 Rob Delaney as Brian Tobin, Beef's elder brother. Brian moved to Anchorage and works as a jacuzzi salesman. He has a daughter, Becca, about the same age as Ham and Judy.
 Ray Dewilde (credited in seasons 1 and 2 as Ray J. Dewilde) as Mayor Peppers, the mayor of Lone Moose and a member of the Sugpiaq tribe.
 Brooke Dillman as Zoya, a resident of Lone Moose with an Eastern European accent who works at the Russian Restaurant. Dillman also voices Dell, a fisherwoman and sometime romantic interest of Beef's; Doris, Tusk Johnson's camera operator and eventual fiancée; and other characters.
 John Early as Henry Tuntley, a friend of Moon's who wears a sweater-vest and glasses. Early also played the voice of one of Judy's teeth in "Brace/Off Adventure", and a boat mechanic in "Beef's in Toyland Adventure".
 Ziwe Fumudoh (credited as Ziwe) as Amelia, a friend of Judy's who works part-time at her mother's pizzeria, DiGigantico's Pizza. Amelia's mother used to home-school her, until she found the math lessons too difficult.
 Ron Funches as Jerrybee "Jerry" Shaw, Honeybee's brother who appears in flashbacks in the third episode "Avocado Barter Adventure" before the character moves to Lone Moose, Alaska in the eighth episode "Keep Beef-lievin' Adventure" and  gets a job making public appearances in a Bigfoot mascot costume.
 John Gemberling as Russell, a friend of Moon's and fellow member of the Junior Janitors. He frequently talks about how much he likes and admires his mom's boyfriend Jamie.
 Patti Harrison as Debbie Van, a bratty frenemy of Moon's who is into figure skating. Her last name was given as "Gladu" in her first appearance in the episode "Keep Beef-lievin' Adventure", but changed to "Van" in subsequent appearances. Harrison also voiced Momma Marita in "Tasteful Noods Adventure".
 David Herman as Gill Beavers, a boy with an unrequited crush on Judy, and Santiago Carpaccio, a tall, quiet resident of Lone Moose who speaks in a non-specific Southern European accent, plus other characters. 
 Aloysius Hootch as Delmer, an older Yup'ik man who owns an ice rink. In the episode "Wanted: Delmer Alive Adventure", it's revealed that Delmer acted as a father figure to Beef and his brother Brian due to their own parents being unreliable.
 Charlie Kelly as Drama John, a classmate of Ham and Judy.
 Martha Kelly as Bethany Bones, a classmate of Ham and Judy.
 Alanis Morissette as Alanis Morissette, Judy's interpretation of the acclaimed singer and her apparent imaginary friend who only appears in the Aurora Borealis. Judy often speaks to her for guidance on certain things. Serving to reference Morissette's role as God in Kevin Smith's View Askewniverse films Dogma and Jay and Silent Bob Strike Back, Morissette is occasionally shown to exist separately from Judy's imagination.
 Megan Mullally as Alyson Lefebvrere, Judy's boss at the photography studio and an artist in her own right. Mullally also voices recurring characters Dorothy Tuntley (the mother of Moon's friend Henry) and Vera Warren (an angry older resident of Lone Moose).
 Ruby Nicazio as Quinn Notti, Moon's classmate and a fellow member of the Junior Janitors.
 Judith Shelton as Londra Pennypacker, a mild-mannered fisherwoman whose boat is moored close to Beef's. In a running gag, the Tobins are regularly too busy to stop and talk to Londra.
 Mindy Sterling as Junkyard Kyle, a mechanically adept woman in a pink jumpsuit who runs a local junkyard. Sterling also voices Sandy Flarts, the Lone Moose school superintendent, in "Period Piece Adventure".
 Robin Thede as Diondra Tundra, a TV reporter for Channel 36 News. Thede also voices Dr. Helena, Judy's orthodontist, in "Brace/Off Adventure".
 Paul F. Tompkins as Theodore Golovkin, a teacher at the Lone Moose school with a brusque manner and an obsessive-compulsive disorder.
 Julio Torres as Crispin Cienfuegos, Ham's boyfriend, who moved to Lone Moose from Michigan with his family and has a part-time job at the smoothie stand at the mall. Judy had an unrequited crush on Crispin for the first six episodes of the first season, ending when Crispin took Ham to the Thomas Wintersbone Memorial Ladies' Choice Dance in "Pride & Prejudance Adventure".
 Ariel Tweto as Kima Brewper, Judy's best friend.
 Kelvin Yu as Steven Huang, a classmate of Ham and Judy and Judy's love interest in the first season; by the season 2 episode "Stools Rush In Adventure", Judy and Stephen are no longer romantically involved. Yu is also credited as the voice of Seaman Sammy in "From Tusk Til Dawn Adventure".

Guest

 Nat Faxon as Calvin Prescott
 Chelsea Peretti as Lara Silverblatt, a bush pilot and Wolf's ex-girlfriend
 Daniele Gaither as Ruth Shaw (Honeybee's mother) and other characters
 Phil LaMarr as Louis Shaw, Honeybee's father
 Tim Jennings as Sebastian (the San Diego curling team captain), Paul Reingold, and other characters 
 Rose Abdoo as Belva and Ziska
 Mark McKinney as Morris, Stan Donovan, Werner, and Jobiathan Flavor
 Leslie Jordan as Thomas Wintersbone
 Shannon Woodward as Becca Tobin, Brian's daughter
 Sean Clements as John Johnson, editor of the town's newspaper, the Lone Moose Wind
 Timm Sharp as Greg the shoe salesman
 Kurt Braunohler as Hayward Melm
 J. K. Simmons as Tusk Johnson
 Rhys Darby as Denny the Snowflake
 Jamie Moyer as Tanya the Snowflake, the Grown-Up Titanic Baby and Jennifer the Smuggler
 Wyatt Cenac as Dr. Gary, Colton the Croonin' Cod, TV weatherman Harry Hotfog, and other characters 
 Margaret Cho as Jan, owner of a toaster store at the mall
 Lizzie Molyneux-Logelin as Tooth #4
 Reggie Watts as Quay
 Karen Kilgariff as Ronda, the Crust Station waitress
 Eugene Cordero as Craig Ptarmigan
 Mel Rodriguez as Game Warden Burt
 Ken Marino as Poppa Paul, Reggie, and Phoenix Phlying
 Carlos Alazraqui as Mr. Cienfuegos and Doug
 Gary Anthony Williams as New Kids on the Dock Vocalist 
 Chris Garcia as Dan, Tusk Johnson's old sidekick
 Drew Droege as Cal the Smuggler and Matthew, the bed salesman
 Kevin Avery as Jarvis Dufraine and other characters
 Guy Fieri as Guy Fieri
 Ashley Nicole Black as Lotion Leslie
 Krizia Bajos as Ruthina Jean
 Tiffany Smith as Dabbie
 Adam Godley as Dick Chateau and Archie Scrimm
 Keiko Agena as Karen Butler
 Mark Proksch as Councilman Roy Fletcher
 Nicole Byer as Coach Kiely and other characters

 Lisa Rinna as Lisa Rinna
 Lennon Parham as Marie, Russell's mom
 Jenny Yang as Carissa Van, Debbie's mom
 Missi Pyle as Ms. McNamara
 Karen Chee as Chrissy Carr
 Holland Taylor as Goldie
 David Huntsberger as Kurt the pottery teacher
 Timothy Olyphant as Wade
 Jo Firestone as Greta Meatweep 
 Lindsey Stoddart as Cousin Danica
 Michelle Badillo as Mrs. Cienfuegos and other characters
 Andrea Savage as Chief Elba, Chief Edna's sister and the police chief of Orca Bay
 Keith Ferguson as Niles Crane
 Tuc Watkins as Danny Vroom and other characters
 Pam Grier as Neckbone the truck driver
 Gary Cole as Elwin Kreb
 Murray Bartlett as Crocodile Rob
 Katie Crown as Very Drunk Lady at Danky's and Possessed Patsy
 Colin O'Donoghue as Dr. Callahan
 Karan Soni as Gavin
 Brian Gattas as Luke
 Jaboukie Young-White as Holden
 Tom Ellis as Rick Chateau
 Megan Stalter as Jill Gerbert-Erble
 Edi Patterson as Stacy B. and Jackie
 Princess Daazhraii Johnson as Esther Brewper, Sunshine, and Movie Audience Member 
 Brian Wescott as Walt Brewper and Dink
 Qituvituaq Litchard as Dane 
 Monique Moreau as Dr. French
 Paget Brewster as Ms. Anderson
 Rich Rinaldi as Italian Pit Crew Member
 Jana Schmieding as Zelda Blop
 Dana Min Goodman as Paula
 Julia Wolov as Bev
 Phil Augusta Jackson as Barry, Honeybee's ex-boyfriend
 Andrew Rannells as Rocky Ritz

Episodes

Production

Development 
On September 28, 2018, it was first announced that the series was in development, from creators Wendy and Lizzie Molyneux and Minty Lewis, with Loren Bouchard also set to executive produce. The series was officially given a series order by Fox on May 9, 2019, with Bento Box Entertainment, Fox Entertainment, and 20th Television serving as the production companies.

On May 13, 2019, it was announced that the series was set to premiere in 2020, however, on May 11, 2020, it was announced that it was instead planned to premiere mid-season during the 2020–21 television season. It was later revealed that the series would premiere in February 2021. On June 22, 2020, Fox renewed the series for a second season ahead of its premiere.
On December 18, 2020, it was announced that the series would premiere on February 14, 2021, as part of Fox's Animation Domination programming block. On December 22, 2020, it was announced that the series would receive a special preview on January 3, 2021. On May 17, 2021, Fox renewed the series for a third season, the day after the first season finale was broadcast. The second season premiered on September 26, 2021. The third season premiered on September 25, 2022. A fourth season has also been picked up.

Casting 
On September 28, 2018, when the series was first announced, it was revealed that Nick Offerman, Jenny Slate, Megan Mullally, Paul Rust, Aparna Nancherla, Will Forte, and Dulcé Sloan had been cast in the series. On June 22, 2020, it was revealed that Alanis Morissette would voice herself in the series. In February 2021, more cast members joined the crew in guest roles. Judith Shelton appears in the first episode as Londra Pennypacker, a lady who works at the dock, as well as Julio Torres as a boy who works at the mall at a smoothie shop and who Judy has a crush on, named Crispin Cienfuegos. In the third episode, Gabe Delahaye voices the barterer Old Jody Jr. in a guest role.

Broadcast
In Canada, the series aired on Citytv for its first season.

The show is available to stream on Hulu in the United States, and able to purchase on all major digital stores. In India, the series is simulcasted on Disney+ Hotstar because of 20th Television's output deal with Star India.

The show is available to stream on Disney+ via the Star content hub in selected territories.

In Denmark, the show initially premiered exclusively on Xee on July 9, 2021. The show was later added to Disney+ in Denmark on March 9, 2022, with both the entire first season and the first three episodes from the second season included.

Reception

Critical response
On Rotten Tomatoes, the series holds an approval rating of 100% based on 15 reviews, with an average rating of 7.90/10. The website's critics consensus reads, "As cozy as a night spent relaxing by the fireplace with your favorite funny people, The Great North is a delightfully hilarious addition to Fox's Animation Domination lineup." On Metacritic, the series has a weighted average score of 77 out of 100 based on 10 critics, indicating "generally favorable reviews."

Daniel Fienberg of The Hollywood Reporter praised the performances of the actors and complimented the humor of the series, comparing it to Bob's Burgers, while noting that the series made token references to Indigenous representation and said it should embrace those more in future episodes, writing, "Then again, with memorable characters (captured in that familiar Bento Box Entertainment style), running credit gags and catchy episode-closing songs, I don’t think Bob’s Burgers as reimagined by somebody who just watched Northern Exposure would be such a bad thing anyway." Margaret Lyons of The New York Times praised the humor of the show, saying the series recalls Bob's Burgers and seems to act as a spin-off, writing, "This new comedy by some of the folks from Bob’s Burgers isn’t technically a spinoff, but it might as well be — in a good way! [...] like many comedies, it gets funnier as it goes along, but it has a silly sweetness from the start."

Joyce Slaton of Common Sense Media rated the series 4 out of 5 stars, praised the depiction of positive messages and role models, calling some of the characters lovable, supportive, and tolerant, and complimented the humor and the diversity of the cast, writing, "There's a strong streak of sweetness in this comedy, particularly in the way that family love is strong and central. The show clearly has a love for oddballs, and the humor is gentle and non-mocking." Ben Travers of IndieWire gave the series a B+ grade, called The Great North a "worthy successor to Bob’s Burgers," stating the series manages to keep its own identity even across its similarities with Bob's Burgers, praised the animation of the show for its color palette, while noting The Great North is the only animated Fox comedy with a black family member saying, "After decades spent churning out Simpsons clones, Fox is finally building off its other, nicer, animated sitcom — with encouraging results."

Ratings

Accolades 
In 2021, The Great North was nominated for Best Animated Series for the 27th Critics' Choice Awards.

References

External links
 
 

2020s American adult animated television series
2020s American animated comedy television series
2020s American sitcoms
2020s American LGBT-related animated television series
2021 American television series debuts
American adult animated comedy television series
American animated sitcoms
American LGBT-related sitcoms
Animated television series about families
English-language television shows
Fox Broadcasting Company original programming
Television series by 20th Century Fox Television
Television series by Fox Entertainment
Television series by Fox Television Animation
Television shows set in Alaska
Television shows written by the Molyneux sisters
Television series about single parent families